Fries Deschilder (born 15 September 1992) is a Belgian footballer who plays for Sint-Eloois-Winkel.

Career

Club Brugge
Deschilder joined Club Brugge at the age of 14 and progressed through the ranks at the club's youth level and in 2011, he signed a professional contract for three-years set to expire on 30 June 2014. He made his debut for Brugge in a 5–0 win against Westerlo coming on a substitute in 85th minute coming on for Niki Zimling. His second appearance came in the 1–1 draw against Zulte-Waregem when he came on in the 32nd minute replacing Víctor Vázquez. His last appearance of the 2011–12 season came in the 1–1 draw against Beerschot, where he came on as a substitute yet again this time coming on for Lior Refaelov in the 85th minute. Eighteen days later, Deschilder got his first experience of European football against Birmingham City in the Europa League (2–1 defeat), coming on as a substitute in the 82nd minute replacing Jonathan Blondel.

Eindhoven
In August 2012, Deschilder joined Dutch side FC Eindhoven on a season-long loan. He made his official debut for the club in the 1–0 loss against Veendam, coming on during the 46th minute for Rob van Boekel. On the third matchday he was allowed to come on again, this time in the 70th minute against Cambuur. It took until the end of September before he was allowed to make an appearance again, this time in the KNVB Cup against JVC Cuijk, where he came on in the 75th minute. On 23 November 2011, he made his first start, and also received his first yellow card for the club. Two weeks later he made another start against AGOVV. Already after 12 minutes he scored in that match and thus scored the first goal of his professional career, although the match ended in a humiliating 1–6 defeat. The following week he was also in the starting line-up and played his first full match for the team.

Sint-Eloois-Winkel
In July 2018, Deschilder signed with Sint-Eloois-Winkel Sport in the fourth-tier Belgian Second Amateur Division.

International
Deschilder has been capped at Belgium U18 level.

References

External links
 Voetbal International profile 

1992 births
Living people
Belgian footballers
Club Brugge KV players
FC Eindhoven players
Sint-Eloois-Winkel Sport players
Belgian Pro League players
Eerste Divisie players
Sportspeople from Ypres
Footballers from West Flanders
Association football midfielders
K.S.V. Roeselare players
Belgian Third Division players
Belgian expatriate footballers
Expatriate footballers in the Netherlands
Belgian expatriate sportspeople in the Netherlands